The women's race of the 2007 Sparkassen Giro Bochum took place on 5 August 2007. It was the 7th women's edition of the Sparkassen Giro Bochum. The race started and ended in Bochum, Germany with 80 participants. The race is a UCI 1.1 category race.

Results

References

2007 in German sport
Sparkassen Giro
2007 in women's road cycling